Harold B. Barclay (January 3, 1924 – 20 December 2017) was a professor emeritus in anthropology at the University of Alberta, Edmonton, Alberta. His research  focused on  rural society in modern Egypt and the northern Arab Sudan as well as political anthropology and anthropology of religion. 
He is also commonly acknowledged as a notable writer in anarchist theory, specialising in theories involving the structure and oppressive systems of the state and how society would operate without a formal government.

Select bibliography
Buurri al Lamaab, a suburban village in the Sudan. Cornell studies in anthropology. Ithaca, N.Y.: Cornell University Press, 1964.
The role of the horse in man's culture. London: J.A. Allen, 1980.  
Culture: the human way. Calgary. Alta., Canada: Western Publishers, 1986.  
Anthropology and Anarchism. Cambridge: the Anarchist Encyclopaedia, 1986.
People without Government: An Anthropology of Anarchy, rev. ed., Seattle: Left Bank Books, 1990. . 
Culture and anarchism. London: Freedom Press, 1997.  
The state. London: Freedom Press, 2003.  
Longing for Arcadia: memoirs of an anarcho-cynicalist anthropologist. Victoria, B.C.: Trafford, 2005.

References

Further reading 

 

1924 births
2017 deaths
American anarchists
American anthropologists
Canadian anarchists
Canadian anthropologists
Cultural anthropologists
Academic staff of the University of Alberta